Ladda decca is a species of butterfly in the family Hesperiidae. It is found in Ecuador and Peru.

Subspecies
Ladda decca decca - Ecuador
Ladda decca doppa Evans, 1955 - Peru

References

Butterflies described in 1955